The Chattanooga Area Regional Transportation Authority (CARTA) is the mass transit provider for Chattanooga, Tennessee and its vicinity.

Public transportation first appeared on the streets of Chattanooga in 1875, utilizing horse-drawn trollies. The two main routes followed Market Street and East Ninth Street (now Martin Luther King Boulevard). In 1889, the trolleys were replaced with electric streetcars.  With the advent of the internal combustion engine, buses began to appear more frequently.  In 1941, Southern Coach Lines took over the public transit operations, and the last streetcar ran in 1946.

City control
In 1973, the City of Chattanooga purchased the assets of the former Southern Coach Lines, and formed the Chattanooga Area Regional Transportation Authority.  CARTA now operates 17 bus routes, trimmed down from 30, as some routes have been consolidated or eliminated.

In addition, CARTA also operates a free downtown shuttle bus service, utilizing electric buses, which runs between the Chattanooga Choo Choo (the former Terminal Station) and the Tennessee Aquarium.  Public parking is available at both locations.  CARTA owns and operates the historic Lookout Mountain Incline Railway, which ascends from the St. Elmo neighborhood to the town of Lookout Mountain, Tennessee. CARTA also provides paratransit van services, called CARTA Care-A-Van.

List of routes

1. Alton Park
Chattanooga Choo Choo, The Villages at Alton Park, Piney Woods, Wheeler Homes, Erlanger Community Health Center (Southside), Alton Park Recreation Center, Howard School of Academics & Technology, and Food City.
2. North Chattanooga
North Market Street, North Shore Market, Coolidge Park, Renaissance Park, Spears Avenue, Cherokee Boulevard, CADAS, Johnson Mental Health Center, North Chattanooga Recreation Center
3. Enterprise South
Hamilton County Dept. of Education, Amazon Fulfillment Center, Volkswagen Group of America
4. Eastgate/Hamilton Place
UT-Chattanooga, UTC Place, Client Services Building/Human Services, Tennessee Temple University, Brainerd Road, Eastgate Town Center, Hamilton Place Mall, Walmart, Lee Highway, Parkridge Hospital, Warner Park
5. North Brainerd "Dial-a-Ride" Route
Eastgate Town Center, Brainerd High School, North Brainerd Community, Eastwood Manor, Dalewood Middle School, Woodmoore School, Foxwood Plaza, Wilson Air Center
6. East Brainerd "Dial-a-Ride" Route
Hamilton Place Mall, East Brainerd Road, Gunbarrel Road, Gunbarrel Pointe, Memorial Atrium, Erlanger East, McCutcheon Road, Health Center at Standifer Place, Rainbow Creek Apartments, U.S. Express, Social Security Office
7. Chattanooga Housing Authority
UTC, Erlanger, Fortwood Center, CARTA, Engel Stadium, Warner Park, Alexian Brothers, Chattanooga Housing Authority located on Holtzclaw Avenue at Citico
8. Eastdale (Weekdays/Saturdays)
Battery Heights, Tunnel Boulevard, Signal Centers, Greenwood Road, Foxwood Plaza
9. East Lake
Chattanooga Choo Choo, Main Street, Dodds Avenue, Goodwill Industries, East Side Community Center, East Lake Courts, East Lake Academy of Fine Arts
10A. East Chattanooga-Avondale
UT-Chattanooga, Avondale, Erlanger Community Health Center (Dodson Ave.), Erlanger Medical Center, Hamilton County Health Department, Hardy Elementary School, Warner Park
10C. East Chattanooga-Campbell St.
UT-Chattanooga, Erlanger Medical Center, Hamilton County Health Department, Campbell Street, Highway 58, Warner Park, Erlanger Community Health Center (Dodson Ave.)
10G. East Chattanooga-Glenwood
UT-Chattanooga, Glenwood, Erlanger Medical Center, Hamilton County Health Department, Memorial Hospital, Parkwood Nursing Home, Parkridge Medical Center,  Warner Park
13. Rossville
East Lake Courts, 23rd Street, Chattanooga Community Kitchen, Senior Neighbors, Whiteside Faith Manor
14. "Mocs Express" (free shuttle for UT-Chattanooga students, faculty and staff.)
UTC Campus, UTC Place, Engel Stadium, Downtown Chattanooga
15. St. Elmo
St. Elmo Ave and Broad Street
16. Northgate
Northgate Mall, Hixson Pike, Riverview, Highland Plaza, Lowe's, Home Depot, Hobby Lobby, Stockdale's
19. Cromwell Road
Chattanooga Metropolitan Airport, UT-Chattanooga, Erlanger Medical Center, Eastwood Manor, Cromwell Hills, Waterford Place, Main Postal Facility, Farley's & Sathers Candy Company, Wrigley, CARTA, Shepherd Road, Shallowford Road, Airport Road, Greyhound Bus Station, Chattanooga Housing Authority
21. Golden Gateway
Boynton Terrace, College Hill Courts, Chattanooga Convention Center, Jaycee Towers Apartments, Overlook Apartments, Finley Stadium
28. Amnicola Highway
Chattanooga State Community College, Chattanooga Area Food Bank, Police Services Center

Fares
, fares rates for their respectable services are:

Bus -
Adult: $1.50
Child (under 6): FREE with paying passenger, limit 3.
Senior Citizens (Ages 65+): $0.75 (CARTA Special Fare I.D. Card Required+)
Persons with Disability: $0.75 (CARTA Special Fare I.D. Card Required+)
Students: $0.75 (CARTA Student Bye Pass Card Required for students in Grades 6-12)
+Medicare card is accepted as proof of eligibility for the CARTA Special Fare ID Card.

CARTA Care-A-Van -
One way: $2.50
Round Trip: $5

Specials -
24 Hour Unlimited Ride Pass: $4
31 Day Unlimited Ride Pass: $50

References

External links

Bus transportation in Tennessee
Transportation in Chattanooga, Tennessee
1973 establishments in Tennessee
Government agencies established in 1973
Organizations based in Chattanooga, Tennessee